Savidge may refer to:

People
Cecil Savidge (1905–1975), Chief Commissioner of Balochistan
John Savidge (1924–1979), British track and field athlete
Malcolm Savidge (born 1946), British politician
Martin Savidge (born 1958), American television journalist
Vaughan Savidge (born 1956), English BBC newsreader

Other uses
Savidge Lake, a lake in Minnesota, United States

See also
Savage (disambiguation)
Savige (disambiguation)
George Salvidge (1919–1941), English footballer